Georgios Anatolakis (born 16 March 1974) is a Greek former professional footballer who played as a defender. He is well known in Greece for his strength, passion and persistence. A strong aerial challenger, he also advances on set pieces to find himself scoring on several occasions. He most notably scored the winning goal for Olympiacos' first match in the renovated Georgios Karaiskakis.

Playing career

Clubs
Alongside Predrag Đorđević, Anatolakis is one of two Olympiacos players to have been part of all nine of their Greek championship victories since 1996.

Produced by Ethnikos Pylaias, Anatolakis first appeared in the Greek top flight as an 18-year-old for Iraklis FC in the 1992/93 season, going on to make a further 133 outings for the Thessalonika-based team prior to a move to Olympiacos during 1996/97.

A fearsome competitor, he was a key squad member as Olympiacos won every title from then until 2003/04, and the following season Anatolakis had his finest hour as the league championship was regained. His contribution to their double-winning campaign was rewarded with a two-year contract extension, and the following season the league and Greek Cup were captured again.

In July 2007, Anatolakis joined Greek side Atromitos after being released by longtime club Olympiacos, after 1 year left Atromitos F.C.

Anatolakis reached 67 appearances (1 goal) in all UEFA competitions with Iraklis FC and Olympiakos.

National team
Anatolakis made his international debut for Greece on 27 March 1996 in a friendly against Portugal in Lisbon. Many thought that would be the start of a lengthy career but he was subsequently more out of the side than in and did not appear from 1999 until October 2005, when he was a substitute in a 1-0 FIFA World Cup qualifying win against Georgia. He has since featured regularly.

Political career 
Anatolakis was elected in B' Piraeus, in the 4 October 2009 elections, as a member of the Popular Orthodox Rally Party and was a member of the Greek parliament.

Honours

Championships
1996-1997
1997-1998
1998-1999
1999-2000
2000-2001
2001-2002
2002-2003
2004-2005
2005-2006
2006-2007

Greek Cups
1998–1999
2004–2005
2005–2006

References

External links

1974 births
Living people
Footballers from Thessaloniki
Greek footballers
Greece international footballers
Olympiacos F.C. players
Iraklis Thessaloniki F.C. players
Atromitos F.C. players
Association football central defenders
Greek sportsperson-politicians
Popular Orthodox Rally politicians
21st-century Greek politicians
Greek MPs 2009–2012